The Wedge Community Co-op or The Wedge is a food cooperative located in Minneapolis, Minnesota. Located at 2105 Lyndale Avenue South, the Wedge derives its name from the popular nickname for the Lowry Hill East neighborhood, called "The Wedge" due to its shape. The Wedge is a member of the NCG.

History

The Wedge was formed in 1974 in a basement apartment on Franklin Avenue in Minneapolis. It was formed after a group of neighbors met that summer to organize a cooperative store to provide themselves with whole and natural foods, preferably in bulk quantities to save money. In 1979, the Wedge moved to Lyndale Avenue. Wedge had a member labor program in place until 1992, when it built a new store in the lot adjacent to its store. An addition which doubled the retail space was built in 1997.

The Wedge was the first certified organic grocery store in Minnesota.

In 2015, the Wedge became the first consumer co-op in the Twin Cities metro area to unionize.

In 2016 the members voted to consolidate with Linden Hills Co-op, forming the Twin Cities Co-op Partnership (TCCP). The combined entity had 25,000 members and employed over 500 employees.

Warehouse
The Wedge Co-op has a wholesale distributor, the Co-op Partners Warehouse, which services retail co-ops, natural food stores and restaurants in the Upper Midwest. Co-op Partners Warehouse began as a produce wholesaler and has since expanded into organic milk, cheese and yogurt; soy products, fresh juices and smoothies; and a selection of dry grocery items. In April 2012, employees of the Wedge's Co-op Partners Warehouse formed a union to voice their dissatisfaction with wages and management decisions. In November 2015, employees of the Wedge Lyndale location voted 76 to 31 to unionize its retail location.

Gardens of Eagan
In January 2008, the co-op leased 'Gardens of Eagan', one of the oldest local certified organic produce farms in the Twin Cities area. The co-op has the option to purchase the land after five years, and has been running the operation since summer 2008. The Wedge put the farm up for sale in April 2015, deciding to concentrate on its retail operations.

Organic Field School
In 2008, the Wedge Co-op formed the Organic Field School (OFS) at Gardens of Eagan.  OFS is an on-farm facility with a focus on education and research for farmers, educators, policy makers and the public.

WedgeShare
Since 1997, The Wedge has administered a charitable giving program based on the 7th cooperative principle. The donations are given to community groups chosen by the Wedge membership by vote. In its history, WedgeShare has given nearly $240,000 to non-profit organizations.

IS4C

The Wedge uses IS4C, a Point of Sale (PoS) system for cooperatives. The program was developed by Tak Tang, an employee of The Wedge.

See also
 List of food cooperatives

References

External links
Official website
Co-op Partners Warehouse

Food and drink companies established in 1974
Companies based in Minneapolis
Food cooperatives in the United States
Organic food retail organizations
Supermarkets of the United States
Consumers' cooperatives in the United States
1974 establishments in Minnesota